Braff is a surname. Notable people with the surname include:
 Joshua Braff (born 1967), American fiction author, the older brother of actor Zach Braff
 Menalton Braff (born 1938), Brazilian author
 Ruby Braff (1927–2003), American jazz trumpeter and cornetist
 Zach Braff (born 1975), American actor and film director